Winnipeg has been home to several professional hockey, football and baseball franchises. There have also been numerous university and amateur athletes.

Hockey
Winnipeg has a storied hockey history and has been home to several top amateur and professional hockey clubs.

The Winnipeg Victorias were three-time Stanley Cup champions (1896, 1901 and 1902).  Prior to the founding of national hockey program, three Winnipeg-based clubs won gold medals representing Canada:  the Winnipeg Falcons at the 1920 Winter Olympics in Antwerp, Belgium, the Winnipeg Hockey Club at the 1932 Winter Olympics in Lake Placid, New York, and the Winnipeg Monarchs at the 1935 World Ice Hockey Championships

Winnipeg teams dominated the early years of the Allan Cup, Canada's senior amateur championship. Between 1909 and 1918, when the Allan Cup was decided through challenges,  the Winnipeg Victorias, the Winnipeg Hockey Club, the Winnipeg Monarchs, and the Winnipeg 61st Battalion each won at least one championship. The Winnipeg Maroons participated in the Western Canada playdowns for the Allan Cup 12 times between 1953 and 1967, advancing to the national finals twice, with a loss at the 1961 Allan Cup and winning its only national championship at the 1964 Allan Cup.

Memorial Cup champion teams from Winnipeg include the Winnipeg Junior Falcons (1921), Elmwood Millionaires (1931), Winnipeg Monarchs (1935, 1937, 1946), Winnipeg Rangers (1941, 1943), St. Boniface Seals (1938), and Winnipeg Braves (1959).

The old Winnipeg Arena, built in 1955, was originally home to the Winnipeg Warriors of the Western Hockey League (minor professional) from 1955 to 1961. The Warriors were World's Minor Professional Champions in 1955-56, winning the Edinburgh Cup. The arena was also home to the Winnipeg Warriors of the WHL from 1980 through 1984, and the Winnipeg Monarchs of the same league from 1967 to 1974.

The Winnipeg Jets were founded in 1972 as one of the original teams of the World Hockey Association and went on to win three Avco Cups in eight years.  After the WHA folded in 1979, the Jets entered the National Hockey League.  The Jets featured such Hall of Famers as WHA coach Rudy Pilous and players Bobby Hull, Dale Hawerchuk, and (briefly) Serge Savard, as well as other popular players such as            Teemu Selänne and Phil Housley. Jets fans were known for creating the Winnipeg White Out, a tradition in which fans dressed in all-white for playoff games.  In 1996, the team was sold to an ownership group based in Phoenix, Arizona, and were relocated, becoming the Phoenix Coyotes.

From 1996 to 2011, Winnipeg was home to the Manitoba Moose.  The Moose played in the now-defunct International Hockey League, before joining the American Hockey League in 2001.  The Moose were the top minor league affiliate to the NHL's Vancouver Canucks.  In 2004, the Moose moved from the Winnipeg Arena to the new MTS Centre. (since renamed Canada Life Centre).  But returned to the city in 2015 as the AHL affiliate of the Winnipeg Jets.

In 2011, True North Sports & Entertainment, owners of the Moose and MTS Centre, purchased the NHL's Atlanta Thrashers, and relocated the team to Winnipeg, they were subsequently renamed the Winnipeg Jets.  The team plays out of Bell MTS Place.

Current Winnipeg-based amateur teams of note are the University of Manitoba Bisons, Winnipeg Ice (Western Hockey League), Winnipeg Blues (Manitoba Junior Hockey League) and Winnipeg Freeze (Manitoba Junior Hockey League).  Hockey Winnipeg, the local branch of Hockey Manitoba oversees minor hockey in the city.

Major international hockey events played in Winnipeg include Game 3 of the 1972 Summit Series, various Canada Cup games, and the 1999 World Junior Ice Hockey Championships.

Winnipeg has produced Hall of Fame hockey players Andy Bathgate, Bill Mosienko, Art Coulter, Ching Johnson, Frank Fredrickson, Jack Ruttan and Terry Sawchuk. Beyond that, 183 major league professional hockey players were born in Winnipeg.

Football
Winnipeg has a team in the Canadian Football League, the Blue Bombers, who have won 12 Grey Cups, the league's championship trophy. The Winnipeg 'Pegs won the Grey Cup in 1935. Winnipeg also hosted the Grey Cup game in 1991, 1998, 2006, and 2015.

Baseball

Minor-league baseball has a long history in Winnipeg.

1902–1942: Winnipeg Maroons of the original Northern League

1953–1964: Winnipeg Goldeyes, an affiliate of the St. Louis Cardinals in the Class C Northern League

1970–1971: Winnipeg Whips, AAA affiliate of the Montreal Expos

In 1994, the Rochester Aces of the independent Northern League re-located to Winnipeg, and the team was renamed the Goldeyes.

Initially, the team played at multi-purpose Winnipeg Stadium.  In 1999, the team moved to the downtown CanWest Global Park, a baseball-only stadium.  The Goldeyes are owned by former mayor Sam Katz.

Soccer
Winnipeg was once home to the Winnipeg Fury professional soccer team, playing in the Canadian Soccer League and winning the final championship to be hosted in the league.

On May 4, 2015, Investors Group Field in Winnipeg was named as one of six venues that will host the 2015 FIFA Women's World Cup.

On May 7, 2017, it was also announced that Winnipeg would have a team in the Canadian Premier League for the inaugural season for 2019.

Horse racing
The first track horse race in Winnipeg took place in 1922.  Whittier Park and Polo Park were used as racetracks in the past.  Today, Assiniboia Downs is a six and one half furlong oval located on the western edge of the city. It is operated as a non-profit organization by the Manitoba Jockey Club. Live thoroughbred horse racing takes place in the summer.

Amateur sports

Winnipeg hosted the 1967 Pan American Games and 1999 Pan American Games. In 1991, the city hosted the fifth Western Canada Summer Games.

Some of the notable sports figures from Winnipeg include six time Olympic speedskating medalist and most decorated Canadian Olympian Cindy Klassen, Olympic Taekwondo athlete and bronze-medallist Dominique Bosshart, Summer and Winter Olympic medal winner Clara Hughes and Canadian Olympic Women's Hockey Gold Medalist Jennifer Botterill.

Daniel Yanofsky, the first chess Grandmaster developed in the British Commonwealth, lived in Winnipeg from infancy, and he organized and played in Canada's first Supergrandmaster chess tournament in Winnipeg 1967.

The Winnipeg area is the only place in Canada where bandy is played.

Winnipeg has had several competitive Dodgeball players represent Canada in the WDBF (World Dodgeball Federation) World Championships. Winnipeg's first player to make Team Canada was Guylaine San Filippo who won Silver in 2016 and made the team again 2017 where they placed fourth. Winnipeg's next player to make team Canada was Julie McLaren in 2019 but the Women's team did not win a medal that year. World Championships were not held during 2020 and 2021 due to the Covid-19 Pandemic. For the 2022 World Championships, in addition to the standard Men's and Women's divisions, the WDBF introduced Mixed (male & female) divisions for both the Foam and Cloth styles of play, and Winnipeg saw significantly more representation. Catie Brady won Gold with the Women's Foam team. The Mixed Foam team won gold with significant representation from Winnipeg: Coach Amanda Furst, team Captains Jaycie Morris and Jesse Copet, along with teammates Tayler Yuel, Nick Grenier, Eldon Wu and Rylan Yarjau. Jaycie Morris was awarded MVP for the Mixed Foam division. Colton Bertrand (mixed cloth) and Kahleigh Krochak (women's cloth) also represented Winnipeg at the World Championships in 2022 but did not place.

Skateboarding

Winnipeg has a number of skateboard parks- some leftovers from the 1970s and many more recent additions to the skateboard scene. In 2006, Winnipeg completed a project that saw the construction of a large skate plaza at the Forks. The plaza was visited by Tony Hawk in his Secret Skate Park Tour in the same year. In 2007 and 2008 the plaza was host to the Rogers WAM International skate board competition, in addition to numerous other competitive and non-competitive events.

University sports
The University of Winnipeg and the University of Manitoba have active and successful programs in sports, especially volleyball and basketball. The University of Winnipeg's women's basketball team won 88 consecutive games during the 1990s, tying a college sports record. The University of Manitoba Bisons football team has won three Vanier Cup trophies, won the Hardy Trophy ten times and won the Mitchell Bowl four times. Volleyball is particularly strong, with consistently high-calibre play, dating back to the standing (in 2007) record of four consecutive national university championships held by the University of Winnipeg Wesmen since the early 1970s.

Curling
Winnipeg is also home to many of the world's best curling teams and has hosted the World Curling Championships in 1978, 1991 and 2003. Several World Curling Championships winners have called Winnipeg home including Don Duguid, Kerry Burtnyk, Jeff Stoughton, Georgina Wheatcroft and Jennifer Jones.

Roller Derby
Winnipeg is home to the Winnipeg Roller Derby League, a league member of the Women's Flat Track Derby Association founded in 2008. The league consists of three home teams (the Backseat Betties, the Corporation, and the Valkyries' Wrath) and two travel teams (the Bombshell Brawlers and the WRDL All-Stars). The WRDL All-Stars are a Women's Flat Track Derby Association charter team, travelling around North America to play other charter teams and competing to climb international rankings. Awareness of this sport continues to grow in Winnipeg, with an inaugural sold-out bout taking place at the Winnipeg Convention Centre in February, 2010 and the league marking its 10th Anniversary Season in 2018.

Notable sports figures

Colorado Avalanche forward Tyler Arnason (Played in MJHL)
Chicago Blackhawks forward Jonathan Toews (Played in MJHL)
Minnesota Wild defenceman Cam Barker (Played in MJHL)
Olympic Gold medalist speed skater Cindy Klassen
All Elite Wrestling (AEW)/World Wrestling Federation/Entertainment (WWF/WWE) wrestler Chris Jericho
World Wrestling Federation (WWF) wrestler Roddy Piper
All Elite Wrestling (AEW )/ New Japan Pro Wrestling (NJPW) wrestler Kenny Omega
Retired professional wrestler and current New Japan Pro Wrestling commentator Don Callis

See also
Winnipeg Toilers

References